Mariam Bolkvadze was the defending champion but lost to Daria Kudashova in the first round.

Moyuka Uchijima won the title, defeating Natalija Stevanović in the final, 6–3, 7–6(7–2).

Seeds

Draw

Finals

Top half

Bottom half

References

External Links
Main Draw

President's Cup - Singles
2022 Women's Singles